St. Julien is an historic plantation home located in Spotsylvania County, Virginia. The main house was built by Francis Taliaferro Brooke in 1794, with an addition added in 1812. There are several outbuildings that surround the main house. They include a slave quarters, smokehouse, milk house and law office used by Francis Brooke. Though relatively small in size, the home is exemplary of Federal architecture. The house was added to the National Register of Historic Places in June 1975

Design
The house is a two-story, single-pile (only one room between the front and back of the building), Federal structure. St. Julien has a five-bay front. An unusual design element of the house is the in antis, or recessed portico at the summit of stone steps up to the front door. The most distinctive feature of St. Julien is its entrance bay. The balcony of the portico is faced with a smaller scale version of the modillion-and-fretwork cornice that encircles the house. A fanlight with wooden mullions. Above the front door, on the second floor, a door and sidelights mirror the portico's design. The house has a hip roof covered with sheet metal with interior end chimneys.

History
St. Julien was the home of Francis Taliaferro Brooke (1763-1851), an important figure in early Virginia politics. Brooke was elected to the State Senate in 1800 and appointed a Judge of the General Court in 1804. Brook eventually became the President of the Supreme Court of Appeals in Virginia. Brook purchased  in Spotsylvania County in 1796 when he moved his practice and residence to Fredericksburg, Virginia. This tract became St. Julien.

Henry Clay was a frequent visitor to St. Julien. Brooke lived on the plantation from the time of the building of the house until his death there in 1851.

References

Houses on the National Register of Historic Places in Virginia
Federal architecture in Virginia
Houses completed in 1794
Houses in Spotsylvania County, Virginia
Houses completed in 1812
National Register of Historic Places in Spotsylvania County, Virginia
Taliaferro family of Virginia
1794 establishments in Virginia
Slave cabins and quarters in the United States